St. Mark's Episcopal Church is an historic Episcopal church located in the High Hills of Santee west of Pinewood, South Carolina. On January 20, 1978, it was added to the National Register of Historic Places as St. Mark's Church.

History
St. Mark's Parish was established in 1767 by act of the South Carolina Assembly. The present church, built in 1855, is the fourth or fifth church erected by the parish but the first at this location, which was donated by the Richardson and Manning families. The church built in 1767 near Summerton was burned by the British during the American Revolution because of the patriotic activity of its then rector. At least six governors, three Richardsons and three Mannings, regularly attended services at St. Mark's either here or at previous locations. St. Mark's was the parish church for both the Manning family plantations, including Millford Plantation, and the Richardson family plantations, including Bloomhill Plantation.

Cemetery
St. Mark's Cemetery is included in the historic place designation.

Current use
St. Mark's Episcopal Church is no longer an active parish.

See also

List of Registered Historic Places in South Carolina

References

External links
 National Register listings for Sumter County
 Photos of St. Mark's and it cemetery
 History of St. Mark's Church

Churches on the National Register of Historic Places in South Carolina
Episcopal churches in South Carolina
Cemeteries in South Carolina
Churches in Sumter County, South Carolina
High Hills of Santee
19th-century Episcopal church buildings
National Register of Historic Places in Sumter County, South Carolina
Churches completed in 1855
Gothic Revival church buildings in South Carolina